Tenmile Creek is a tributary of the West Fork River,  long, in north-central West Virginia in the United States.

Location and tributaries
Tenmile Creek and its watershed are located entirely in western and northern Harrison County.

Watershed
According to the West Virginia Department of Environmental Protection, approximately 81% of Tenmile Creek's watershed is forested, mostly deciduous.  Approximately 13% is used for pasture and agriculture, and less than 1% is urban.

Alternative name
According to the Geographic Names Information System, Tenmile Creek has also been known historically as Coal Bank Creek.

See also
Fletcher Covered Bridge
List of West Virginia rivers

References 

Rivers of West Virginia
Rivers of Harrison County, West Virginia